Hype! The Motion Picture Soundtrack is the soundtrack album of the Seattle music scene documentary Hype!. It was released in 1996 in conjunction with the film.

Initial release 
The soundtrack was released on CD on October 1, 1996.

Track list

Vinyl box set release
An additional box set was released on November 5, 1996. 2000 copies were made. The set consists of four color vinyl 7" records in die-cut sleeves, and packaged with a fold-out poster.

Eight of the tracks on the box set are identical to the tracks on the CD. One ("Hotcakes") is a live version of the same song (studio version) on the CD. "Dark Corner of the World" and the live version of "Watch Outside" were not released officially anywhere else.

Track list

References

Documentary film soundtracks
Grunge compilation albums
1996 compilation albums
1996 soundtrack albums
Grunge soundtracks
Sub Pop soundtracks
Sub Pop compilation albums
Albums produced by Jack Endino